"Freedom" is a rock song by Jimi Hendrix that is often regarded as one of the most fully realized pieces he wrote and recorded in the months before his death.  It incorporates several musical styles and the lyrics reflect various situations facing Hendrix at the time. 

Heendrix recorded the song in mid-1970 with his post-Band of Gypsys backing lineup of drummer Mitch Mitchell and bassist Billy Cox, along with additional musicians. "Freedom" became the opening track on The Cry of Love (1971) and, in the U.S., it was released as Hendrix's first posthumous single.

Lyrics
In a song review for AllMusic, Matthew Greenwald writes: "The lyrics seems to be a simple, swaggering lust song (something Hendrix was indeed expert at), but the urban vibe in the title also relates to some of Hendrix's own managerial and business problems at the time." Biographer John McDermott also feels that the lyrics touch upon Hendrix's relationship with Devon Wilson and her heroin addiction:

Music writer Keith Shadwick believes that the lyrics are among Hendrix's "strongest" from his last studio efforts and adds, "It could be about freedom in the wider world as much as it is a cry for freedom for two lovers at war with one another.

Releases and charts
"Freedom" was released March 5, 1971, when it was used as the opening track on The Cry of Love, the first posthumous Hendrix album. In the US, the song was also released as a single and was only one of two posthumous Hendrix singles to appear on the Billboard Hot 100, where it reached number 59.

Personnel
Jimi Hendrixlead vocals, guitar, piano
Billy Coxbass guitar
Mitch Mitchelldrums
Juma Sultanpercussion, conga
The Ghetto Fighters  Arthur and Albert Allenbacking vocals

Other releases
"Freedom" is now one of the more popular songs in the Hendrix catalogue and is included on several compilations. In 1997, it was used to lead off First Rays of the New Rising Sun, the most comprehensive attempt to present Hendrix's planned fourth studio album. The song is also one of the post-Band of Gypsys developed numbers that Hendrix regularly performed in concert.

Additional releases include:

Demos
The Jimi Hendrix Experience – Record Plant, New York City,  February 6, 1970
West Coast Seattle Boy: The Jimi Hendrix Anthology – Record Plant, May 15, 1970

Performances
Isle of Wight (1971) – recorded August 31, 1970
Blue Wild Angel: Live at the Isle of Wight (2002) – as above
Freedom: Atlanta Pop Festival (2015) – recorded July 4, 1970
Live in Maui (2020) – recorded July 30, 1970

Compilations
The Essential Jimi Hendrix (1978)
Cornerstones: 1967–1970 (1990)
Experience Hendrix: The Best of Jimi Hendrix (1997)
Voodoo Child: The Jimi Hendrix Collection (2001) – live version from Isle of Wight

Personnel
Jimi Hendrixlead vocals, guitar, piano
Billy Coxbass guitar
Mitch Mitchelldrums
Juma Sultanpercussion
The Ghetto Fighters  Arthur and Albert Allenbacking vocals

Notes
Footnotes

Citations

References

1971 songs
1971 singles
Jimi Hendrix songs
Reprise Records singles
Songs written by Jimi Hendrix
Songs released posthumously
Song recordings produced by Eddie Kramer
Song recordings produced by Jimi Hendrix
Songs about freedom